A caltrop (also known as caltrap, galtrop, cheval trap, galthrap, galtrap, calthrop, jackrock or crow's foot) is an area denial weapon made up of two or more sharp nails or spines arranged in such a manner that one of them always points upward from a stable base (for example, a tetrahedron). Historically, caltrops were part of defences that served to slow the advance of troops, especially horses, chariots, and war elephants, and were particularly effective against the soft feet of camels. In modern times, caltrops are effective when used against wheeled vehicles with pneumatic tires.

Name
The modern name "caltrop" is derived from the Old English  (heel-trap), such as in the French usage  (shoe-trap). The Latin word  originally referred to this and provides part of the modern scientific name of a plant commonly called the caltrop, Tribulus terrestris, whose spiked seed cases resemble caltrops and can injure feet and puncture bicycle tires. This plant can also be compared to Centaurea calcitrapa, which is also sometimes referred to as the "caltrop". Trapa natans, a water plant with similarly shaped spiked seeds and edible fruit, is called the "water caltrop".

History

The caltrop was called   by the ancient Romans, or sometimes , the latter meaning "jagged iron" (literally "iron jagged thing"). The former term derives from the ancient Greek word  meaning three spikes. Caltrops were used in the Battle of Carrhae in 53 BC.

The late Roman writer Vegetius, referring in his work De re militari to scythed chariots, wrote:

Another example of the use of caltrops was found in Jamestown, Virginia, in the United States:

The Japanese version of the caltrop is called . Makibishi were sharp spiked objects that were used in feudal Japan to slow pursuers and also were used in the defence of samurai fortifications. Iron makibishi were called , while the makibishi made from the dried seed pod of the water caltrop, or water chestnut (genus Trapa), formed a natural type of makibashi called . Both types of makibishi could penetrate the thin soles of shoes, such as the  sandals, which were commonly worn in feudal Japan.

Similar devices

Punji sticks perform a similar role to caltrops. These are sharpened sticks placed vertically in the ground. Their use in modern times targets the body and limbs of a falling victim by means of a pit or tripwire.

During the Second World War, large caltrop-shaped objects made from reinforced concrete were used as anti-tank devices, although it seems that these were rare. Much more common were concrete devices called dragon's teeth, which were designed to wedge into tank treads. As dragon's teeth are immobile, the analogy with the caltrop is inexact. Another caltrop-like defence during World War II was the massive steel, freestanding Czech hedgehog; the works were designed as anti-tank obstacles, and could also damage landing craft and warships that came too close to shore. These were used by the Germans to defend beaches at Normandy and other coastal areas. Czech hedgehogs are heavily featured and plainly visible in the 1998 Steven Spielberg-directed American epic war film Saving Private Ryan, throughout the scenes early in the film depicting the June6, 1944 Omaha Beach assault (part of the Normandy landings during World War II).

Tetrapods are concrete blocks shaped like caltrops, which interlock when piled up. They are used as riprap in the construction of breakwaters and other sea defences, as they have been found to let the water pass through them and interrupt natural processes less than some other defenses.

Modern uses

Tire deflation device

Researchers have tried to develop a caltrop-like device to deflate vehicle tires in a manner useful to law enforcement agencies or the military.

World War I
During service in World War I, Australian Light Horse troops collected caltrops as keepsakes. These caltrops were either made by welding two pieces of wire together to form a four-pointed star or pouring molten steel into a mould to form a solid, seven-pointed star. The purpose of these devices was to disable horses. They were exchanged with French troops for bullets. The Australian Light Horse troops referred to them as "Horse Chestnuts".

World War II
Caltrops were used extensively and effectively during World War II. The modifications and variants produced by the Special Operations Executive (SOE) and the Office of Strategic Services (OSS) of the United States are still in use today within special forces and law enforcement bodies.

The Germans dropped crow's feet. These were made from two segments of sheet metal welded together into a tetrapod with four barbed points and then painted in camouflage colours. They came in two sizes with a side length of either . They were dropped from aircraft in containers the same size as a 500 kg bomb and were dispersed by a small explosive charge.

Labour disputes
Caltrops have been used at times during labour strikes and other disputes. Such devices were used by some to destroy the tires of management and replacement workers.

Caltrops, referred to as "jack rocks" in news articles, were used during the Caterpillar strike in 1995, puncturing tires on vehicles crossing the picket line in Peoria, Illinois. Because of their small size and the difficulty proving their source, both the company and the United Auto Workers blamed each other. Collateral damage included a school bus and a walking mail carrier. In Illinois, the state legislature passed a law making the possession of such devices a misdemeanor.

Symbolic use

A caltrop has a variety of symbolic uses and is commonly found as a charge in heraldry. For instance, the Finnish noble family Fotangel (Swedish for 'caltrop') had arms gules, three caltrops argent.

It has also been adopted by military units: the caltrop is the symbol of the US Army's III Corps, which is based at Fort Hood, Texas. III Corps traces its lineage to the days of horse cavalry, which used the caltrop as a defensive area denial weapon.

The caltrop is also the symbol of the United States Marine Corps' 3rd Division, formed on 16 September 1942.

The Savannah Association annually commemorate Operation Savannah, a battle from 1975 to 1976 in the South African Border War (also known as the Namibian War of Independence). The battle involved a covert intervention by the South African Defence Force (SADF) during the Angolan War of Independence, subsequent Angolan Civil War and Namibian War of Independence. During this battle many South African soldiers earned the Honoris Crux for bravery against Angolan and Cuban forces. Their insignia was a caltrop.

See also

 Area denial weapon
 Booby trap
 Knucklebones, a game, with similar hazards

Footnotes

References
 Clan Drummond, a brief history, at Scot Clans
 John L. Cotter and J. Paul Hudson, New Discoveries at Jamestown, Site of the First Successful English Settlement in America, 1957 Project Gutenberg
 

Official documents
 

Roman weapons
Roman fortifications
Area denial weapons
Fortification (obstacles)
Medieval weapons
Guerrilla warfare tactics
Metallic objects